Larry Fuller may refer to:
 Larry Fuller (choreographer), American dancer and choreographer
 Larry Fuller (American football) (1923–2005), American football running back
 Larry Fuller (cartoonist), African-American underground comix writer, publisher and promoter
 Larry Fuller (pianist) (born 1965), American jazz pianist